The Westinghouse H840CK15 was the second consumer all-electronic color television set offered for sale in the United States on February 28, 1954. The set was discontinued about six months after its introduction because of larger and less expensive 19 and 21-inch color sets becoming available in July and December 1954 such as Motorola and RCA. The set used the 15GP22 cathode ray tube.

References 

Products introduced in 1954
Television sets